April Jazz is an annual jazz music festival held in Tapiola, Espoo, Finland at the end of April. It has been held annually since 1987.

In 2020 it was organized as a live streaming event through keikalla.fi service, because of the coronavirus pandemic.

References

External links
 Official site

Jazz festivals in Finland
Tapiola
Music festivals established in 1987
Spring (season) events in Finland